The 1911 Marquette Blue and Gold football team was an American football team that represented Marquette University as an independent during the 1911 college football season. In its fourth and final season under head coach William Juneau, the team compiled a 7–0–2 record.

Schedule

References

Marquette
Marquette Golden Avalanche football seasons
College football undefeated seasons
Marquette Blue and Gold football